Geoffrey Graeme Brock (born 1950) is an Australian politician. He is an Independent member in the South Australian House of Assembly, representing the seat of Stuart since the 2022 South Australian state election. Prior to this, he represented the seat of Frome from the 2009 Frome by-election until a redistribution leading up to the 2022 state election.

Brock has served as the Minister for Local Government, Minister for Regional Roads and Minister for Veterans Affairs in the Malinauskas Labor cabinet since March 2022, and is one of the two regional ministers in the cabinet. Brock was previously the Minister for Regional Development and Minister for Local Government in the Weatherill Labor cabinet from 2014 until Labor's defeat at the 2018 election.

Background
Brock had worked in Port Pirie's lead smelter, which was eventually acquired by Nyrstar, since arriving in the town in 1976. He was first elected to the Port Pirie Regional Council (at that time a City Council) in 1989, and served on numerous community committees before being elected mayor in May 2003, defeating sitting mayor Ken Madigan by 3,297 votes to 2,173. He retired from Nyrstar in September 2007, and he and his second wife Lyn have 12 grandchildren between them.

Political career

2009 Frome by-election

Brock had a shock win at the 2009 Frome state by-election, defeating the Liberal candidate Terry Boylan. He had a high local profile prior to the election, having served for almost six years as council mayor. Independent Senator Nick Xenophon also campaigned for Brock.

On 23.6 percent of the primary vote and 51.7 percent of the two-candidate-preferred vote, Brock's election depended on preferences from Labor, Nationals SA, and the SA Greens, the former two having placed him second on their how-to-vote card. His own how-to-vote card saw him preference the Nationals, Labor, Liberal, Greens, and One Nation, in that order. The by-election was closely contested, with the result being uncertain for over a week. Initial reports suggested a slight swing to the Liberal candidate Terry Boylan on the two-party-preferred count against Labor, with Brock close behind Labor. By 21 January 2009, both the ABC's Antony Green and the state electoral office were indicating a 2-point swing against the Liberals toward Labor on 51.4 percent, but not enough to lose the seat. Liberal leader Martin Hamilton-Smith claimed victory on behalf of the party.

However, the result hinged on the performance of Brock against Labor in the competition for second place. Brock won the primary vote in the Port Pirie area and picked up enough National and Green preferences to overtake the Labor candidate for second place by 30 votes. He then picked up enough Labor preferences to take the seat off the Liberals on a two-candidate-preferred vote of 51.7 percent (a majority of 665 votes), despite a slight improvement in the Liberal vote since the previous count.

Parliamentary service
At the 2010 election, Brock increased his primary vote to 37.7 percent and two-candidate vote to 57.5 percent. Labor won from the Liberals the two-party-preferred vote on 50.1 percent. At the 2014 election, Brock increased his primary vote to 45.2 percent and two-candidate vote to 58.8 percent. The election resulted in a hung parliament with 23 Labor seats, 22 Liberal seats, and two independents. The balance of power was held by crossbench independents Brock and Bob Such. Such did not indicate who he would support in a minority government before he was diagnosed and hospitalised with a brain tumour and took medical leave one week after the election. University of Adelaide Professor and political commentator Clem Macintyre said Such's situation virtually guaranteed Brock would side with Labor. With 24 seats required to govern, Brock backed Labor. Macintyre said:

If Geoff Brock had gone with the Liberals, then the Parliament would have effectively been tied 23 to 23, so once Bob Such became ill and stepped away then Geoff Brock, I think had no choice but to side with Labor.

Brock accepted the cabinet positions of Minister for Regional Development and Minister for Local Government in the Weatherill Ministry. In return, Brock agreed to support the Labor government on confidence and supply while retaining the right to otherwise vote on conscience. A few months later, Labor achieved majority government when Nat Cook won the 2014 Fisher by-election which was triggered by the death of Such. Despite this, Weatherill kept Brock and another independent minister Martin Hamilton-Smith in cabinet, giving the government a 26 to 21 parliamentary majority.

Brock held the ministerial portfolios until Labor lost government in the 2018 election. He retained the seat of Frome with a small increase in his primary vote.

A redistribution in 2020 transferred parts of seat of Frome to the seat of Stuart. In the areas transferred from Frome to Stuart, including Port Pirie where Brock was based in, Brock had polled 65% of the first preference vote and 75% after preferences in the 2018 election, while the rest of Frome was dominantly Liberal Party voting. It was no longer feasible for Brock to contest Frome with the new boundaries, so instead, he decided to contest for the seat of Stuart at the 2022 election. Brock was successful in his transfer, defeating incumbent member and Deputy Premier Dan van Holst Pellekaan.

Labor formed government in the election and Brock was again appointed to the Malinauskas Labor ministry as an Independent minister, serving as the Minister for Local Government for the second time, as well as Minister for Regional Roads and Minister for Veterans Affairs. He said he had not expected a ministerial position, and the offer by new Premier Peter Malinauskas two days before the swearing-in ceremony came as "a heck of a shock". He emphasised that "he was not a Labor minister, but would vote with cabinet on decisions made by it", and Malinauskas said that Brock's independent would be "maintained and utterly respected". Brock was one of the two regional cabinet ministers, the other being Clare Scriven.

See also
 Electoral results for the district of Frome
 Electoral results for the district of Stuart

References

External links
 GeoffBrock.com.au official website
 
 The other side of Geoff Brock: A biography by 'The Recorder' 26/2/2009
 Frome MP Geoff Brock not aligned to any party: ABC Video 3/2/2009
 

1950 births
Living people
Members of the South Australian House of Assembly
Independent members of the Parliament of South Australia
People from Port Pirie
Mayors of places in South Australia
21st-century Australian politicians